Siah Kamar or Seyah Kamar or Siyah Kamar may refer to various places in Iran:

East Azerbaijan Province
 Seyah Kamar, East Azerbaijan

Hamadan Province
 Siah Kamar, Asadabad

Kermanshah Province
 Siah Kamar, Kermanshah
 Siah Kamar-e Olya, Kermanshah County
 Siah Kamar-e Olya Maruf, Kermanshah County
 Siah Kamar-e Sofla, Kermanshah County